Native title in Australia is decided principally by the High Court and the Federal Court.

References

High Court
Native title case law in Australia
Australian case law